Touchwood is decayed wood used for tinder. The phrase "touch wood" is another way of describing knocking on wood. The terms may also refer to

Geography in Canada
 Touchwood Hills, a range of hills in Saskatchewan
 Rural Municipality of Touchwood No. 248, Saskatchewan
 Touchwood (electoral district) a former provincial electoral district which was merged to create Last Mountain-Touchwood in 1975
 Touchwood Hills Post Provincial Park a provincial park and historic site in Saskatchewan
 Touchwood Lake (Alberta)
 Touchwood Lake (Manitoba)

Business
 Touchwood Pacific Partners, an American film financing partnership founded by The Walt Disney Company
 Touchwood, Solihull, a shopping centre in the West Midlands of England

Culture
 Touch Wood, a 1934 play by English writer Dodie Smith
 Lord and Lady Touchwood, characters in the 1693 play The Double Dealer by English playwright William Congreve
 Mr. Touchwood, a character in the 1823 novel Saint Ronan's Well by Scottish writer Walter Scott
 "Touchwood (Forest Mix)", a song by Tangerine Dream on the 1996 album The Dream Mixes